Gerald Jadiel Díaz Agrait (born March 23, 1999) is a Puerto Rican football player who plays as a midfielder for Bayamón FC in the Liga Puerto Rico and the Puerto Rico national team.

Career
Díaz began playing in Puerto Rico at local club Caguas Bairoa. He later spent time in Spain in UD Vall de Uxó and Levante UD. He played on his first college year at Marshalltown Community College before returning to Puerto Rico in 2019 to play for Universidad del Sagrado Corazón.

International career
Gerald was called up in 2016 for the Puerto Rico national under-20 football team for the first round of World Cup qualifiers. 

He made his debut with the Puerto Rico national football team in July 2017 in a friendly match against Indonesia.

In 2018 he was called up once again for the U20 under head coach Amado Guevara for the 2018 CONCACAF U-20 Championship where he scored a goal. In July 2019, he played for the Puerto Rico national under-23 football team for the 2020 Olympic Games qualification where he scored one goal.

He scored his first international goal on October 15, 2019 on a 2-3 victory over Anguilla.

Career statistics

Club

Notes

International

International goals
Scores and results list Puerto Rico's goal tally first.

References

1999 births
Living people
People from Caguas, Puerto Rico
Puerto Rican footballers
Puerto Rican expatriate footballers
Puerto Rico international footballers
Association football midfielders
Tercera División players
Levante UD footballers
Puerto Rican expatriate sportspeople in Spain
Expatriate footballers in Spain
Universidad del Sagrado Corazón alumni